Fabriciana kamala, the kamala fritillary, is a butterfly of the family Nymphalidae. 
It has an eastern range in the Palearctic realm – the Himalayas, Tibet, Kashmir and Kashmir - northwest India, Spīn Ghar, Chitral to Kumaon.
The species was first described by Frederic Moore in 1857.

References 

Fabriciana
Butterflies described in 1857